Jose Romeo Orquejo Lazo is a Filipino Catholic clergyman who is the thirteenth ordinary of the Archdiocese of Jaro, and  the sixth to have the title of archbishop. He was born on January 23, 1949, in San Jose de Buenavista, Antique to Juan P. Lazo and Fausta Orquejo, both now deceased, and was baptized on February 13 of the same year at the St. Joseph Parish of the same town.

Formation and ordination
Lazo began his training for the priesthood at St. Peter's Seminary in San Jose, Antique, studying Philosophy from 1966 to 1970. In 1970 he transferred to St. Francis Xavier Seminary in Davao City, where he finished his philosophical training in 1971. He continued to take theological formation in the same seminary until 1973. The following year, he transferred to St. Vincent Ferrer Seminary in Jaro, Iloilo City, where he finished his priestly training in 1975. He received the Sacrament of Holy Orders, on April 1, 1975, being incardinated in the Prelature (later Diocese) of San Jose, Antique.

Priesthood

Lazo began his ministry in Dao, in 1975, where he later became the parish priest until 1978. From 1978 to 1981, he taught at St. Peter's Seminary in Antique. He was given charge as parish priest of St. Peter's Parish from 1981-1983, while also being in charge of the Catechetical Institute of the Prelature of Antique.

Lazo was appointed rector of St. Peter's Seminary from 1983 to 1985; parish priest of Bugasong from 1985 to 1986; President of St. Anthony's College from 1986-1989; and Vicar General of the Diocese of Antique from 1987 to 1996. From 1996-1997, he spent a year of sabbatical leave, doing post-graduate studies in pastoral theology in Berkeley, California, USA, and, returning to Antique in 1997, he was nominated parish priest of Pandan. In 1997,  Lazo was assigned as member of the pastoral team of the Assist Program of the Catholic Bishops' Conference of the Philippines (CBCP), and was given an added assignment as spiritual director of the diocesan Seminary from October 2003.

As bishop
Lazo was appointed Bishop of Kalibo by Pope John Paul II on November 13, 2003, and assumed office after he was ordained bishop  by Antonio Franco Apostolic Nuncio to the Philippines, together with the co-ordaining bishops, Angel N. Lagdameo and Romulo de la Cruz on December 29, 2003. He took possession of the see of Kalibo, on January 8, 2004.

On July 21, 2009, Lazo was appointed as the fourth bishop of Antique by Pope Benedict XVI. During his term as Bishop of San Jose de Antique, in 2011, he consecrated Jose Corazon T. Tala-oc, priest of his diocese, to succeed him in the Diocese of Kalibo.

In the CBCP Lazo worked as vice chairman of the Commission on the Clergy (of which he remains a member) and a member of the Commission on Seminaries from 2013-2015.

On February 14, 2018, Pope Francis appointed Lazo as the 6th archbishop of the Archdiocese of Jaro, taking possession of the see on April 17, 2018.

References

External links

1949 births
Karay-a people
People from Antique (province)
21st-century Roman Catholic archbishops in the Philippines
 
Living people